Richard Wild may refer to:

 Richard Wild (judge) (1912–1978), Chief Justice of New Zealand
 Richard Wild (cricketer) (born 1973), former English cricketer
 Richard Wild (soccer), American soccer player